Young County is a county located in the U.S. state of Texas. As of the 2020 census, its population was 17,867. Its county seat is Graham. The county was created in 1856 and organized in 1874. It is named for William Cocke Young, an early Texas settler and soldier.

History

Native Americans

The Brazos Indian Reservation, founded by General Randolph B. Marcy in 1854, provided a refuge from warring Comanche for the Delaware, Shawnee, Tonkawa, Wichita, Choctaw, and Caddo peoples, who had migrated into Texas from other areas.  Within the reservation, each tribe had its own village and cultivated agricultural crops. Government-contracted beef cattle were delivered each week. But most settlers were unable to distinguish between reservation and non-reservation tribes, blaming the reservation Indians for the raids by the Comanche and Kiowa. A newspaper in Jacksboro, Texas, titled The White Man (or Whiteman), advocated removal of all tribes from North Texas.

During December 1858, Choctaw Tom, a Yowani married to a Hasinai woman, at times served as an interpreter to Sam Houston. He was among a group of reservation Indians who received permission to hunt outside the reservation boundaries. But on December 27, Captain Peter Garland and a vigilante group attacked Choctaw Tom's camp, indiscriminately murdering and injuring women and children along with the men.

Governor Hardin Richard Runnels ordered Major John Henry Brown of the state militia to the area, with 100 troops to control potential retaliation and unrest. An examining trial was conducted about the Choctaw Tom raid, but no indictments resulted of any militia.

In May 1859, John Baylor led a number of whites who confronted the United States troops defending the reservation, demanding the surrender of certain men from the tribe who they thought were responsible for raids. The military balked, and Baylor retreated, but he killed an Indian woman and an old man in the process. Baylor's group was later attacked by Indians off the reservation, where the military had no authority to intervene.

In May 1871, Kiowa medicine man Satank (Sitting Bear), and Kiowa chiefs Satanta (White Bear), Addo-etta (Big Tree) and Maman-ti (Skywalker) led a force of over 100 Kiowa, Comanche, Kiowa-Apaches, Arapaho, and Cheyenne warriors from the Oklahoma Fort Sill Reservation into Texas. On May 18, the Indians attacked a wagon train belonging to Henry Warren, killing all but five who escaped. Commanding General of the United States Army William Tecumseh Sherman personally arrested Satank, Satanta, and Big Tree at Fort Sill and had them tried in civil court in Jacksboro.  Satank was killed in an attempted escape, and others were found guilty and sentenced to hang.  Their sentences were commuted by Governor Edmund J. Davis at the request of a group of Quakers, and they were later paroled.  The incident was a key element that contributed to the Red River War.

Explorers and settlers
Spanish Colonel Diego Ortiz Parrilla travelled through the county en route to during the 1759 Red River Campaign. Pedro Vial came through the region in 1789 while charting the Santa Fe Trail.

The county was included in the 1841 Republic of Texas empresario Peters Colony land grant. The Young County portion of the grant remained unsettled until the 1850s.

In 1851, Bvt. Brig. Gen. William  G. Belknap  founded the United States Army Fort Belknap.  The fort was surrendered to the Confederacy in 1861, and  reoccupied by federal troops in 1867.  John and Will Peveler established a ranch 2 mi (3 km) below Fort Belknap, becoming the first settlers.

County established

Young County was established by the Texas Legislature in 1856 from Bosque and Fannin Counties and organized later that same year.  Belknap became the county seat. Many of the citizens abandoned the area during the American Civil War due to Indian depredations.  In 1865, the county's government was dissolved, and the county records were transferred to Jacksboro. The county was reorganized in 1874, and the county records were brought back from Jacksboro. This time, the new town of Graham, platted in 1873, was chosen as the county seat.

Gustavus and Edwin Graham began the town of Graham in 1872, and opened the saltworks in 1869.  An 1876 area rancher meeting in Graham, regarding cattle rustling, became the beginnings of what is now known as  the Texas and Southwestern Cattle Raisers Association.  In 1891, a group of investors formed the Graham Mining Company in hopes of mining gold, silver, and coal in the area.

Between 1874 and 1910, railroad lines contributed to the county economy and facilitated transportation, including the Chicago, Rock Island and Gulf Railway, the Wichita Falls and Southern, and the Gulf, Texas and Western Railroad.

Federal programs came to the assistance of farmers and ranchers during the Great Depression. The Work Projects Administration restored old Fort Belknap in 1936. In the 1930s, Young County also joined 65 other counties to form the Brazos River Conservation and Reclamation District.  Oil exploration and production opened the 20th century, and had Lindy Lou No. 1 well come in. Actual production of petroleum began in 1920, and boom towns sprang up around the county. By 1990,  had been produced.

Geography

Major highways
  U.S. Highway 380
  State Highway 16
  State Highway 67
  State Highway 79
  State Highway 114

Adjacent counties
 Archer County (north)
 Jack County (east)
 Palo Pinto County (southeast)
 Stephens County (south)
 Throckmorton County (west)

Demographics

Note: the US Census treats Hispanic/Latino as an ethnic category. This table excludes Latinos from the racial categories and assigns them to a separate category. Hispanics/Latinos can be of any race.

As of the census of 2000,  17,943 people, 7,167 households, and 5,081 families resided in the county.  The population density was 20 people per square mile (8/km2).  The 8,504 housing units averaged 9 per square mile (4/km2).  The racial makeup of the county was 90.98% White, 1.21% Black, 0.64% Native American, 0.26% Asian, 0.04% Pacific Islander, 5.28% from other races, and 1.58% from two or more races.  About 10.62% of the population was Hispanic or Latino of any race.

Of the 7,167 households, 30.80% had children under the age of 18 living with them, 58.00% were married couples living together, 9.40% had a female householder with no husband present, and 29.10% were not families. Around 26.30% of all households were made up of individuals, and 14.30% had someone living alone who was 65 years of age or older.  The average household size was 2.45 and the average family size was 2.94.

A Williams Institute analysis of 2010 census data found about 2.6 same-sex couples per 1,000 households were in the county.

In the county, the population was distributed as  25.00% under the age of 18, 7.00% from 18 to 24, 24.70% from 25 to 44, 23.60% from 45 to 64, and 19.70% who were 65 years of age or older.  The median age was 41 years. For every 100 females, there were 91.60 males.  For every 100 females age 18 and over, there were 86.70 males.

The median income for a household in the county was $30,499, and for a family was $36,698. Males had a median income of $30,257 versus $19,441 for females. The per capita income for the county was $16,710.  About 12.00% of families and 15.70% of the population were below the poverty line, including 21.00% of those under age 18 and 12.90% of those age 65 or over.

Politics
Republican Drew Springer, Jr., a businessman from Muenster in Cooke County, has  represented Young County in the Texas House of Representatives since January 2013.

Communities

Cities
 Graham (county seat)
 Newcastle
 Olney

Unincorporated communities
 Eliasville
 Fort Belknap
 Loving
 Markley
 Murray
 South Bend

Education

School districts serving sections of the county include:
 Bryson Independent School District
 Graham Independent School District
 Newcastle Independent School District
 Olney Independent School District
 Woodson Independent School District

Formerly Megargel Independent School District served a portion of the county. In 2006 Megargel schools closed.

Most of Young County is in the service area for Ranger Junior College. Areas in Graham ISD are in the boundary for North Central Texas College.

See also

 List of museums in North Texas
 National Register of Historic Places listings in Young County, Texas
 Recorded Texas Historic Landmarks in Young County

References

External links
 
 Young County Historical Timeline.  For additional history see:
 
 
 Young County summary at National Association of Counties
 Markley, Texas

 
1874 establishments in Texas
Populated places established in 1874